Matti Salminen (born 13 November 1947) is a Finnish rower. He competed in the men's coxless four event at the 1976 Summer Olympics.

References

1947 births
Living people
Finnish male rowers
Olympic rowers of Finland
Rowers at the 1976 Summer Olympics
Sportspeople from Turku